Best I Ever Had may refer to:
"Best I Ever Had (Grey Sky Morning)", originally recorded by Vertical Horizon and covered by Gary Allan under the title "Best I Ever Had"
"Best I Ever Had" (Drake song)
"Best I Ever Had" (Gavin DeGraw song)
"Best I Ever Had" (State of Shock song)
 "Best I Ever Had" (Nasty C song)